Eric Upton (born April 29, 1953) is a former professional Canadian football offensive lineman with the Canadian Football League team, the Edmonton Eskimos. He was named a CFL Western All-Star in 1979 and was a part of five Grey Cup championship teams with the Eskimos. Upton played CIAU football at the University of Ottawa, where he was a member of the 1975 Vanier Cup championship team.

References

1953 births
Living people
Canadian football offensive linemen
Edmonton Elks players
Edmonton Oilers executives
Ottawa Gee-Gees football players
Players of Canadian football from Ontario
Canadian football people from Ottawa